James Dear MBE (1910–1981) was an English racquets, court tennis, and squash player who effectively won world titles in three different sports during the 1930s, 1940s and 1950s.

Rackets
Dear won the Rackets World Championships from 1947 to 1954, losing the title to Geoffrey Atkins.

Real tennis
He also won the Real tennis world championship from 1955 to 1957.

Squash
Dear also won the most prestigious title in squash, the British Open, in 1939, at a time when there was no official world championship and the British Open champion was acknowledged as the world's best. Dear was also the runner-up at the competition three times in the 1930s and twice in the late-1940s.

Awards
He was among seven British world champions honored at the inaugural Sports Writers' Association - which later became the Sports Journalists' Association in 1949.

See also
 Real tennis world champions
 British Open Squash Championships

References

English racquets players
English real tennis players
English male squash players
1910 births
1981 deaths
World rackets champion